Island Air Cayman Islands BWI is a fixed-base operator in the Cayman Islands providing aircraft charter, air ambulance, ground handling, maintenance, meet and greet services, and aviation management services. The company is located on the grounds of Owen Roberts International Airport. It has one hangar, and one building for flight-planning, Customs and Immigration, and other activities.
In February 2019 Ross Aviation, which also owns Rectrix Aviation, acquired Island Air.

Air ambulance
Island Air provides air ambulance services to the Cayman Islands, Central America, Jamaica, and Cuba.

Charter Services
The company offers charter flights to the following locations:

In the Caribbean:
 
 Nassau
 
 Havana
 
 Montego Bay
  (United States)
Turks and Caicos Islands

In :
 Cancún
 Cozumel

In Central America:

References

External links
Island Air
Island Air Cayman Islands

Aircraft ground handling companies
Companies of the Cayman Islands
Fixed-base operators
Transport companies established in 1987